Garden International School Bangkok is a British curriculum international school in Sathon District, Bangkok, Thailand  that runs from Early Years up to Year 13. The school is part of the  MBF Taylors Ltd. Education Group,  which owns schools in Malaysia, Rayong in Thailand  and also English and bilingual schools in both Thailand and Malaysia.

Accreditation and affiliation 
Garden International School Bangkok is accredited by Education Development Trust and has received the Silver Award for the International School Quality Mark. The school is also accredited by the Office for National Education Standards and Quality Assessment (ONESQA), and is a member of the International Schools Association of Thailand and the Federation of British International Schools in Asia. The school is also a Cambridge International Examinations and Oxford International AQA Examinations Centre.

For Sport and Physical Education, the school competes in The Greater Bangkok Athletics Conference (GBAC).

Curriculum  
The school provides a British education based on the National Curriculum of England and Wales and accepts students from Early Years, up to Year 13.

All students up to the end of Year 9 study the core areas of English, Science, Mathematics, Music, Art, a Foreign Language, Humanities, Computing and Physical Education. After the completion of Year 9, students study their core IGCSE subjects of English, Maths and Science  choosing additional IGCSE subjects so that students take other subjects that are of personal interest and could lead to further study at A-Level.

Students in Years 10 and 11 study a mix of subjects at the International General Certificate of Secondary Education level (IGCSE) which is the culmination of study at Key Stage 4.

The IGCSE subjects available are:
 English as a First Language
 English Literature
 English as a Second Language
 Mathematics 
 Science (Triple Award)
 Coordinated Science (Double Award)
 Combined Science (Single Award)
 Thai
 Geography 
 History
 French
 Mandarin
 Art and Design
 Business Studies
 Design and Technology
 Computer Science
 Information and Communications Technology (ICT)
 Music
 Physical Education

Students at the start of Year 12 study for a further two years with the completion of the Advanced Subsidiary Level (AS Levels) at the end of year 12 and then progressing into Year 13 where students go to complete their A2 Levels to provide completion of the full A-Level which is the culmination of study for Key Stage 5. Students study four subjects at AS Level and then continue with three subjects to complete their studies at A-Level.

The subjects for AS and A-Level are:
 Art and Design
 Biology
 Business Studies 
 Chemistry
 English Literature
 Geography
 History
 Mathematics
 Music
 Physics

Garden students perform consistently well in external examinations, with 95% of the Year 11 class of 2017 attaining at least five IGCSEs with grades A*-Cs and 52% of IGCSE grades being A* or As. One of the Year 11 students received an Outstanding Cambridge Learner Award from Cambridge International Examinations for high achievement.

In addition to academics, the school provides other opportunities for students to develop themselves based on experiential education; outdoor trips and opportunities to work with other schools in extra curricular activities such as the Tournament of Minds where the school qualified for the International finals in 2017 for both Maths and Engineering as well as Language and Literature; and also regularly participates in the International Day of Forests Debates.

Campus  
Garden International School has two campuses separated by Yen Akart Road, which puts its location in downtown Bangkok near both Silom and Sathorn Road, two of Bangkok's commercial hubs. The First School campus educates Early Years, Nursery, Reception, Year 1 and Year 2. The Upper School Campus educates Upper Primary/Key Stage 2 (Years 3 to Year 6), Lower Secondary/Key Stage 3 (Years 7 to Year 9);  Upper Secondary/Key Stage 4 and 5 (Years 10 and Year 11 for students taking IGCSE, and Years 12 and 13 for students taking A Levels).

In 2016 the school began construction on new facilities to expand the Early Years part of the school with a plan to also improve the facilities for the Primary and Secondary School in the 2017/18 academic year.

Houses 
There are four houses at Garden International School Bangkok with each house being represented by an animal native to Thailand and an associated colour. The four houses  with their associated colours are Cobra - Blue, Eagle - Yellow, Gecko - Green, and Tiger - red. New students are allocated to one of the school houses when joining the school with students who have a sibling already at the school being allocated to the same house.

There are competitions between the four houses over the course of an academic year, with sports events and other competitions being contested between the houses. Students also have the ability to individually earn house points over the year based on Academic achievement, Community mindedness and Effort. Cobra won the overal House competition at the end of the 2016/17 academic year.

Notable alumni 
 Park Ji-min

See also

References

External links
 Official website of Garden International School Bangkok
 MBF education group website

International schools in Bangkok
Private schools in Thailand
Educational institutions established in 1999
1999 establishments in Thailand